The 50th Anniversary Collection 1963 is the second Bob Dylan collection released by Sony Music to prevent the recordings from legally entering the public domain in Europe. Released on vinyl only in November 2013, only 100 copies of the six-LP set were produced.

Track listing

References

External links
BobDylan.com – Bob Dylan's Official Website

2013 compilation albums
Bob Dylan compilation albums
Sony Music compilation albums
2013 live albums
Bob Dylan live albums
Sony Music live albums
Albums produced by Tom Wilson (record producer)
Albums produced by John Hammond (producer)
Albums recorded at Carnegie Hall
Copyright extension compilation albums